DZLG (927 AM) Bombo Radyo is a radio station owned and operated by Bombo Radyo Philippines through its licensee People's Broadcasting Service. Its studio and transmitter are located at Bombo Radyo Broadcast Center, Tahao Rd., Central City Subd., Legazpi, Albay.

References

Radio stations in Legazpi, Albay
Radio stations established in 1997
News and talk radio stations in the Philippines